Olle Häger (19 September 1935 – 1 November 2014) was a Swedish journalist, television producer, writer and historian. Häger produced, often accompanied by historian Hans Villius, a large number of historical documentaries. In 1986, Häger and Villius were awarded the Stora Journalistpriset.

References 

1935 births
2014 deaths
20th-century Swedish historians
Swedish male writers